Leptostylus corpulentus is a species of longhorn beetles of the subfamily Lamiinae. It was described by Henry Walter Bates in 1881, and is known from Nicaragua.

References

Leptostylus
Beetles described in 1881